Fyodor Fyodorovich Bogdanovsky ( 16 April 1930 – 2 October 2014) was a Soviet weightlifter. Between 1954 and 1959 he won an Olympic gold medal, four European titles, and five silver medals at world championships, losing to either Pete George or Tommy Kono. He set eight ratified world records, five in the press and three in the total. 

Bogdanovsky took up weightlifting in 1948 and retired in 1963. Later he trained weightlifters in Saint Petersburg, and in the 1970s worked with the Soviet weightlifting team.

References

External links

1930 births
2014 deaths
People from Udomelsky District
Russian male weightlifters
Soviet male weightlifters
Olympic weightlifters of the Soviet Union
Weightlifters at the 1956 Summer Olympics
Olympic gold medalists for the Soviet Union
Olympic medalists in weightlifting
Medalists at the 1956 Summer Olympics
Honoured Masters of Sport of the USSR
European Weightlifting Championships medalists
World Weightlifting Championships medalists
Sportspeople from Tver Oblast